Aneta Stefanovska is a Macedonian-born, Slovenian-British biophysicist. She is a professor of physics at Lancaster University.

Research
Stefanovska's research concerns biological oscillations, particularly in the blood circulatory system, and their analysis using wavelets, nonlinear systems, and the Kuramoto model for systems of coupled oscillators. With Peter V. E. McClintock, she is co-editor of the book Physics of Biological Oscillators: New Insights into Non-Equilibrium and Non-Autonomous Systems (Springer, 2021).

She has also performed research on the genetic basis for periodic breathing, one of the symptoms of altitude sickness.

Education and career
As a student, she worked with Haken at the University of Stuttgart in Germany.

She headed the group of nonlinear dynamics and synergetics as a faculty member at the University of Ljubljana, before moving to Lancaster, where she has been a professor since 2010.

References

External links

Year of birth missing (living people)
Living people
Slovenian biophysicists
Slovenian women physicists
British biophysicists
British women physicists
University of Ljubljana alumni
Academic staff of the University of Ljubljana
Academics of Lancaster University